Nimetska Mokra, from 1946 until 2016 called Komsomolsk ) is a village in the Tiachiv Raion of Zakarpattia Oblast, Ukraine. , its population was 540.

References

Villages in Tiachiv Raion